Mieczysława Ćwiklińska-Steinsberg (née Mieczysława Trapszo, ; 1 January 1879 – 28 July 1972) was a Polish film actress, stage actor, and singer. She was often nicknamed Lińska or Amiette.

Born in Lublin, Poland, Ćwiklińska made her debut in 1900 at the Teatr Ludowy (The People's Theatre) in Warsaw in  Michał Bałucki's play Grube Ryby. She was married three times, her last husband was the book publisher Marian Steinsberg.

In 2013 the Polish Post issued a commemorative stamp of her, with Helena Grossówna and Adolf Dymsza.

Partial filmography

 His Excellency, The Shop Assistant (Jego ekscelencja subiekt, 1933) - Mrs. Idalia Porecka
 Czy Lucyna to dziewczyna? (1934) (with Eugeniusz Bodo) - Countess Renata Czerminska
 Police Chief Antek (Antek policmajster, 1935) - The Governor's Wife
 Wacuś (1935) - The Widow Centkowska
 Panienka z poste restante (1935) - Mrs. Smith
 Dodek na froncie (1936) - Putkovnikova
 Pan Twardowski (1936) - Neta's Aunt
 Straszny dwór (1936) - Swords-woman
 Jadzia (1936) - Mme. Oksza
 Trędowata (1936) - Baroness Idalia Elzonowska
 Amerykańska awantura (1936) - Barbara Malska
 Pani minister tańczy (1937) - Leopoldyna 'Polly' Gribaldi
 Ordynat Michorowski (1937) - Baroness Idalia Elzonowska
 A Diplomatic Wife (1937) - Apolonia
 Dorożkarz nr 13 (1937) (with Stanislaw Sielanski in leading role) - Mrs. Tarska
 Pan redaktor szaleje (1937) - The Aunt
 Znachor (1937) - Florentyna Szkopkowa
 Dziewczęta z Nowolipek (1937) - Raczynska
 Niedorajda (1937)
 Robert and Bertram (1938) - Ippel's Sister
 Adventure in Warsaw (1938) - Apollonia, komische Alte
 Wrzos (1938) - Ramszycowa
 Second Youth (Druga młodość, 1938) - Janina's Mother
 Strachy (1938) - Teresa's aunt
 Profesor Wilczur (1938) - Florentyna Szkopkowa
 Granica (1938) - Ziembiewiczowa
 Gehenna (1938) - Ewelina, the housekeeper
 Sygnały (1938) - Marquise de Boncroix
 Kłamstwo Krystyny (1939) - Teofila Marlecka, Janek's mother
 Biały murzyn (1939) - Countess Lipska, Jadwiga's autun
 Doctor Murek (1939) - Mrs. Czabranowa
 U kresu drogi (1939) - Kordelia, Gabriela's aunt
 Nad Niemnem (1939)
 Ja tu rządzę (1939) - Mother Lulewiczowna
 Złota Maska (1939) - Runicka - Ksawery's Mother
 Żołnierz królowej Madagaskaru (1940)
 Żona i nie żona (1941) - Baroness
 Testament profesora Wilczura (1942)
 Przez łzy do szczęścia (1943) - Lena's secretary
 Border Street (1948) - Mrs. Klara (final film role)

References

Sources

External links

"Mieczyslawa Cwiklinska" Encyclopædia Britannica
Mieczysława Ćwiklińska at the Internet Polish Film Database  
Mieczysława Ćwiklińska; Polskie Kino Lat 30. 

1879 births
1972 deaths
Actors from Lublin
People from Lublin Governorate
Musicians from Warsaw
Polish women singers
Polish film actresses
Polish stage actresses
Golden Laurel of the Polish Academy of Literature
Recipients of the Order of the Banner of Work
20th-century Polish actresses
Recipients of the State Award Badge (Poland)